The Baden culture was a Chalcolithic culture from  3520–2690 BC. 
It was found in Central and Southeast Europe, and is in particular known from Moravia (Czech Republic), Hungary, southern Poland, Slovakia, northern Croatia and eastern Austria. Imports of Baden pottery have also been found in Germany and Switzerland (Arbon-Bleiche III). It is often grouped together with the Coțofeni culture as part of the Baden-Coțofeni culture.

History of research

The Baden culture was named after Baden near Vienna by the Austrian prehistorian Oswald Menghin. It is also known as the Ossarn group  or Pecel culture. The first monographic treatment was produced by J. Banner in 1956. Other important scholars are E. Neustupny, Ida Bognar-Kutzian and Vera Nemejcova-Pavukova.

Baden has been interpreted  as part of a much larger archaeological complex encompassing cultures at the mouth of the Danube (Ezero-Cernavoda III) and the Troad. In 1963, Nándor Kalicz had proposed a connection between the Baden culture and Troy, based on the anthropomorphic urns from Ózd-Centre (Hungary). This interpretation cannot be maintained in the face of radiocarbon dates. The author himself (2004) has called this interpretation a "cul-de-sac", based on a misguided historical methodology.

Chronology
Baden developed out of the late Lengyel culture in the western Carpathian Basin. Němejcová-Pavuková proposes a polygenetic origin, including southeastern elements transmitted by the Ezero culture of the early Bronze Age (Ezero, layers XIII-VII) and Cernavoda III/Coțofeni. Ecsedy parallelises Baden with Early Helladic II in Thessaly, Parzinger with Sitagroi IV. Baden was approximately contemporaneous with the late Funnelbeaker culture, the Globular Amphora culture and the early Corded Ware culture.
The following phases are known: Balaton-Lasinya, Baden-Boleráz, Post-Boleráz (divided into early, Fonyod/Tekovský Hrádok and late, Červený Hrádok/Szeghalom-Dioér by Vera Němejcová-Pavuková) and classical Baden.

Settlement
The settlements were often located on hilltops. Both undefended and fortified settlements are known.

Economy

The economy was mixed. Full-scale agriculture was present, along with the keeping of domestic stock—pigs, goats, etc. The Baden culture has some of the earliest attestation of often wheeled, wagon-shaped models in pottery, sometimes with a handle. There are burials of pairs of cattle that have been interpreted as draft animals. Though there are no finds of actual wagons, some scholars take these finds together as proof for the presence of real wagons.

Burial
Both inhumations and cremations are known. In Slovakia and Hungary, the burned remains were often placed in anthropomorphic urns  (Slána, Ózd-Center). In Nitriansky Hrádok, a mass grave was uncovered. There are also burials of cattle. Up to now, the only cemetery known from the early Boleráz-phase is Pilismárot (Hungary), which also contained a few examples of stroke-ornamented pottery.

In Serbia, anthropomorphic urns were found in the towns of Dobanovci, Gomolava, Perlez and Zemun.

Interpretation

In the Kurgan hypothesis espoused by Marija Gimbutas, the Baden culture is seen as being Indo-Europeanized.

Gallery

Genetics

In three genetic studies the remains of fifteen individuals roughly from 3600-2850 BCE ascribed to the Baden culture were analyzed. Of the nine (plus one Proto-Boleraz) samples of Y-DNA, five belonged to various subclades of haplogroup G2a2 (G2a2b2a1a1c-CTS342, G2a2a2b-Z36525, G2a2b2a1a1b-L497, G2a2a1a2a1a-L166, G2a2b2a1a-PF3346), and four belonged to haplogroup I2 subclades (3x I2a1a1a1-Y11222, I2-P37). The mtDNA extracted included subclades of U5a1, U5b, U8b1a1, J1c, J1c2, J2a1a1, H, H26a, T2, T2b, T2c1d1, HV, K1a and W, summing up the earlier ones, in particular.

According to ADMIXTURE analysis they had approximately 78-91% Early European Farmers, 6-17% Western Hunter-Gatherer and 0-8% Western Steppe Herders-related ancestry, implying that the Indo-European influence on the local population was predominantly cultural and not biological.

See also 
 Ezero culture
 Coțofeni culture
 Prehistory of Transylvania
 Vučedol culture

Notes

Sources
J. Banner, "Die Peceler Kultur. Arch. Hungarica 35, 1956.
Vera Němejcová-Pavuková 1984. "K problematike trvania a konca boleazkej skupiny na Slovensku". Slovenska Arch.  34, 1986, 133–176.
J. P. Mallory, "Baden Culture", Encyclopedia of Indo-European Culture, (Fitzroy Dearborn), 1997.

External links 

Prehistoric wagon models in the Carpathian Basin, 3500-1500 BC (Bondar 2012)
 Baden culture mask
 Baden culture milk churn

Archaeological cultures of Central Europe
Stone Age Europe
Archaeological cultures in Austria
Archaeological cultures in Croatia
Archaeological cultures in the Czech Republic
Archaeological cultures in Hungary
Archaeological cultures in Slovakia